Harry, Henry or Harold Raymond may refer to:
Harry Raymond (baseball) (1862–1925), Major League Baseball player
Harry Raymond (footballer), English footballer
Tubby Raymond (Harold Raymond, 1926–2017), American football and baseball player
Henry Jarvis Raymond (1820–1869), politician and journalist

See also

Hal Raymond, character in An Almost Perfect Affair